Kenya competed at the 1984 Summer Olympics in Los Angeles, United States.  After a twelve-year absence, the nation returned to the Olympic Games after boycotting both the 1976 and 1980 Games.

Medalists

Athletics
 
Men's 400 metres 
David Kitur  
 Heat — 46.25
 Quarterfinals — 45.78
 Semifinals — 45.62 (→ did not advance)

John Anzrah  
 Heat — 46.12
 Quarterfinals — 45.67 (→ did not advance)

James Atuti   
 Heat — 47.04 (→ did not advance)

Men's 5,000 metres 
 Paul Kipkoech 
 Heat — 13:51.54 
 Semifinals — 13:29.08 
 Final — 13:14.40 (→ 5th place)

 Charles Cheruiyot 
 Heat — 13:45.99 
 Heat — 13:28.56 
 Final — 13:18.41 (→ 6th place)

 Wilson Waigwa 
 Heat — 13:48.84 
 Semifinals — 13:38.59
 Final — 13:27.34 (→ 10th place)

Men's 10,000 metres
 Michael Musyoki
 Qualifying Heat — 28:24.24
 Final — 28:06.46 (→  Bronze Medal)

 Joseph Nzau
 Qualifying Heat — 28:28.71
 Final — 28:32.57 (→ 14th place)

 Sostenes Bitok
 Qualifying Heat — 28:12.17 
 Final — 28:09.01 (→ 6th place)

Men's Marathon
 Joseph Nzau
 Final — 2:11:28 (→ 7th place)

 Joseph Otieno
 Final — 2:24:13 (→ 49th place)

 Kimurgor Ngeny
 Final — 2:37:19 (→ 68th place)

Men's Long Jump
 Moses Kiyai
 Qualification — 7.51m (→ did not advance, 16th place)

 Paul Emordi
 Qualification — did not start (→ did not advance, no ranking)

Men's 20 km Walk
 Pius Munyasia
 Final — 1:34:53 (→ 32nd place)

Women's 1,500 metres 
 Justina Chepchirchir 
 Heat — 4:21.97 (→ did not advance)

Women's 3,000 metres 
 Hellen Kimaiyo 
 Heat — 8.57.21 (→ did not advance)

Women's Marathon 
 Mary Wagaki 
 Final — 2:52:00 (→ 43rd place)

Boxing
 
Men's Light Flyweight (– 48 kg)
 Daniel Mwangi
 First Round – Defeated Sanpol Sang-Ano (THA), RSC-3
 Second Round – Lost to Carlos Motta (GUA), 4:1

Men's Bantamweight (– 54 kg)
 Sammy Mwangi
 First Round — Bye
 Second Round — Lost to Robert Shannon (USA), 5-0

Men's Middleweight (– 75 kg)
 Augustus Oga
 First Round – Lost to Pedro van Raamsdonk (HOL), 1:4

Men's Heavyweight (– 91 kg)
 James Omondi
 First Round – Lost to Angelo Musone (ITA), 0:5

Field hockey

Men

Preliminary Round (Group B)
 Lost to Great Britain (1-2)
 Lost to Pakistan (0-3) 
 Defeated Canada (3-2)
 Lost to New Zealand (1-4)
 Lost to Netherlands (0-3)
Classification Matches
 9th/12th place: Defeated United States (0-0) after penalty strokes (6-5) 
 9th/10th place: Defeated Canada (1-0) after extra time → 9th place
Team Roster
 Emmanual Oduol
 Julius Akumu
 Lucas Alubaha
 Michael Omondi
 Parminder Saini
 Manjeet Panesar
 Jitender Panesar
 Peter Akatsa
 Harvinder Kular
 Chris Otambo
 Brajinder Daved
 Raphael Fernandes (hockey player)
 Sunil Chhabra
 Sarabjit Sehmi
 Eric Otieno
 Julius Mutinda

References

Official Olympic Reports
International Olympic Committee results database
sports-reference

Nations at the 1984 Summer Olympics
1984
Summer Olympics